Abura may refer to:
 Abura, Iran, a village in Hamadan Province, Iran
 Achieng Abura (died 2016), Kenyan musician
 Mount Abura, Fukuoka, Japan
 Abura, ancient name of Khabur (Euphrates) a river of west Asia
 Abura-Dunkwa, the capital of Abura/Asebu/Kwamankese District, Central Region, Ghana
 Abura/Asebu/Kwamankese District, Central Region, Ghana